Coreius guichenoti is a species of ray-finned fish in the genus Coreius found the upper reaches of the Yangtze in China.

Although patronym not identified but clearly in honor of the authors’ colleague, zoologist Antoine Alphone Guichenot (1809-1876), Muséum national d’Histoire naturelle (Paris).

References

Coreius
Cyprinid fish of Asia
Freshwater fish of China
Taxa named by Henri Émile Sauvage
Fish described in 1874